Calamagrostis × acutiflora, called feather reed-grass, is a naturally occurring hybrid species of grass in the genus Calamagrostis, occasionally found in Europe and Asia. Its cultivar 'Karl Foerster' has gained the Royal Horticultural Society's Award of Garden Merit.

It is a hybrid of Calamagrostis arundinacea and Calamagrostis epigejos, both widespread Eurasian species.

References

acutiflora
Plants described in 1815 
Flora of Europe
Flora of Asia
Ornamental plants
Plant nothospecies